The Viral Research and Diagnostic Laboratories (VRDL) scheme was introduced by the Government of India under Department of Health Research - Indian Council of Medical Research as outbreaks of viral agents is very common in India. The Central government announced the establishment of 166 research and diagnostics laboratories in 2016. By 2019, 103 new VRDLs were established across India, taking the total count to 105.

History 
There were only two apex testing laboratories in India; National Institute of Virology, Pune and National Centre for Disease Control, New Delhi. These undertook the heavy burden investigations resulting in delay of diagnosis of diseases. In order to strengthen the infrastructure for timely diagnosis of viral epidemics and continuous monitoring of existing as well as new viral strains, new diagnostic centres and institutions were sorely needed.

In 2016, the Central government decided to set up 160 virus testing laboratories across the country. These laboratories will also be equipped to handle cases of bio-terrorism.

The Department of health research of the Ministry of Health and Family Welfare is setting up a three-tier national network of Viral Research and Diagnostic Laboratories (VRDLs). The network is being set up under the department's ongoing research scheme called the Establishment of Network of Laboratories for Managing Epidemics and Natural Calamities.

Objectives of the scheme 

 Creating infrastructures for timely identification of viruses and other agents causing morbidity significant at public health level and specifically agents causing epidemics and/or potential agents for bioterrorism.
 Developing capacity for identification of novel and unknown viruses and other organisms and emerging-reemerging viral strains and develop diagnostic kits.
 Providing training to health professionals.
 Undertaking research for identification of emerging and newer genetically active/ modified agents.

Evaluation of work

The various activities of the Virology Labs will be regularly monitored and guided by the Evaluation Committee, whose findings will be reported to the DHR for information/further action.

The major monitorable targets/ indicators that will be used to review the various categories of Virology Lab.

The scheme has turned out to be hugely successful. As against two VRDL labs in whole of India till 2016; there are now 105 VRDLs operating in India. It is specially important given the risks and epidemiologies of current viral infections which can quickly spread across globe.

Labs

Functional VRDLs testing for COVID-19 
There are 62 functional VRDL laboratories across the country capable of testing for the COVID-19 virus as of March 17.

References

External links
 Indian Council of Medical Research, Official website
 Department of Health Research, Official website
 Data Mining Center of VRDL, Official website

Medical research in India